Óscar Alberto Navarro Meléndez (born January 13, 1979 in La Libertad, El Salvador) is a former Salvadoran professional footballer.

Club career
Navarro started his career with Alianza at a very young age.

He would go on to play for Alianza for a little more than 13 years, winning four league titles with them. He captained Alianza for several years.

He then left Alianza to join Chalatenango and in 2009, moved to Nejapa.

In 2010, he joined UES, but an injury took him out of the game until at least September 2011.

International career
Navarro, a creative midfielder, has also played for the Salvadoran Under-23.

He made his senior debut for El Salvador in an October 2001 friendly match against Mexico and has earned a total of 8 caps, scoring no goals.

He has represented his country at the 2002 CONCACAF Gold Cup and was a non-playing squad member at the 2003 CONCACAF Gold Cup.

His final international game was a July 2003 friendly match against Guatemala.

Titles

References

External links

1979 births
Living people
People from La Libertad Department (El Salvador)
Association football midfielders
Salvadoran footballers
El Salvador international footballers
2002 CONCACAF Gold Cup players
2003 CONCACAF Gold Cup players
Alianza F.C. footballers
C.D. Chalatenango footballers
Nejapa footballers